Triclonide (developmental code name RS-4464) is a synthetic glucocorticoid corticosteroid which was never marketed.

References

Acetonides
Chloroarenes
Corticosteroid cyclic ketals
Diketones
Fluoroarenes
Glucocorticoids
Pregnanes
Abandoned drugs